Thomas Warcop may refer to:

Thomas Warcop, executed with William Andleby
Thomas Warcop (died c.1423), MP for Appleby (UK Parliament constituency) and Westmorland
Thomas Warcop (fl.1414), MP for Westmorland (UK Parliament constituency)
Thomas Warcop (fl.1415), MP for Westmorland (UK Parliament constituency)
Thomas Warcop (1525 - 1589), MP for Westmorland (UK Parliament constituency) 1547